Tonicellidae is a family of molluscs belonging to the order Chitonida.

Genera:
 Boreochiton Sars, 1878
 Spongioradsia Pilsbry, 1894
 Strictochiton Sirenko, 2020
 Tonicella Carpenter, 1873

References

Chitons